Dunatothrips is a genus of thrips in the family Phlaeothripidae.

Species
 Dunatothrips aneurae
 Dunatothrips armatus
 Dunatothrips aulidis
 Dunatothrips chapmani
 Dunatothrips gloius
 Dunatothrips skene
 Dunatothrips vestitor

References

Phlaeothripidae
Thrips
Thrips genera